Melvyn Jerome Davis (born November 9, 1950) is an American former professional basketball player.

A 6'6" power forward from St. John's University, Davis played four seasons (1973–1977) in the National Basketball Association as a member of the New York Knicks and New York Nets. He averaged 5.3 points and 4.3 rebounds in his NBA career.

After taking his basketball career to Europe, where he played in Italy, France, and Switzerland, Davis oversaw the marketing division of PepsiCo. Shortly after, he returned to the NBA and began a long career running player programs; orienting rookies and helping players make a smooth transition to the world post-basketball. In 2005, he was personally appointed by David Stern and accepted the position of Executive Director of the National Basketball Retired Players Association.

Davis holds a marketing degree from St. John's, master's degrees in psychology and counseling from Fordham University, and a master's degree in career planning from New York University.

External links
Career statistics
Where Are They Now? Mel Davis

References 

1950 births
Living people
All-American college men's basketball players
Allentown Jets players
American expatriate basketball people in Italy
American men's basketball players
Basketball players from New York City
Boys High School (Brooklyn) alumni
New York Knicks draft picks
New York Knicks players
New York Nets players
Parade High School All-Americans (boys' basketball)
Power forwards (basketball)
St. John's Red Storm men's basketball players